Pittsburgh International Race Complex (commonly known as Pitt Race) is an auto racing road course located in Wampum, Pennsylvania.  Pitt Race hosts amateur and professional automobile, motorcycle, and karting events.

The track 

Pittsburgh International Race Complex offers three track configurations. All tracks feature significant elevation change throughout and were designed to follow the natural terrain. Pitt Race hosts many different sports car series such as SCCA and NASA, as well as holding track days and open tests for both cars and motorcycles. Since 2017 the track has been host of the MotoAmerica Championship The Tracks hosts a FIM Grade 1 License.

The track also runs a program called Total Vehicle Control (TVC). It provides instruction in situational awareness, driving dynamics, skid control, emergency braking, and accident avoidance techniques.  The program is targeted at commercial and emergency vehicle drivers as well as individuals.

The  kart track was designed by Alan Wilson. It plays host to several major kart series including WKA and USPKS as well as featuring 9.5 hp rental karts.

History 
The idea for the track came from two area attorneys, who attracted local investors to assist in the funding for the facility. The track broke ground in December 2001. It officially opened on July 1, 2002 as BeaveRun Motorsports Complex. It included a  road course, a  kart track, and a six-acre skidpad used for driver training and autocross. In 2004, work began on a one-mile addition to the main track with trees being cleared and plans drawn up, but the project was put on hold in 2006. A 12,000 square-foot event center overlooking the North Track was also constructed at this time.

In 2011 the track was bought by Jim and Kathy Stout, and re-branded as "Pittsburgh International Race Complex." A three-stage renovation of the facility began soon after. The South Track addition, which added  of track, was the largest update to the facility and was completed in 2015. It can be run as its own circuit or run combined with the North Track. An expanded Vehicle Dynamics Area was also part of the facility renovations. Both the North and South Tracks were repaved in 2017. A new timing and scoring building, located on pit lane of the north track, was also completed in 2017.

Lap records 

The official fastest race lap records at the Pittsburgh International Race Complex are listed as:

Gallery

References

External links 
 PittRace.com - Official site of Pittsburgh International Race Complex

Motorsport venues in Pennsylvania
Motorsport
Lawrence County, Pennsylvania
Sports venues completed in 2002
2002 establishments in Pennsylvania
Road courses in the United States